CW3 or CW-3 may refer to:

CW3, a postcode district in the CW postcode area in Cheshire, England
CW-3 or Chief Warrant Officer 3, a United States military rank
CW-3 Duckling, a two-seat amphibian flying-boat
KDLH, a TV station in Duluth, Minnesota  and Superior, Wisconsin affiliated with The CW
Creeper World 3, the third installment in the Creeper World series